The Gas Act 1972 (1972 c. 60) was an Act of the Parliament of the United Kingdom which restructured the British gas industry. It established the British Gas Corporation to exercise full responsibility for the oversight, control and operation of the gas industry. The twelve autonomous Area Gas Boards which had managed the industry in their areas now became regions of the British Gas Corporation. The Gas Council, also established under the Gas Act 1948, was abolished and the Gas Act 1948 was repealed. The provisions of the Act came into force on 1 January 1973.

Background 
The principal role of the twelve Area Gas Boards, established under the Gas Act 1948, was to maintain a supply of gas to match the demand. This was through the operation of local gas works manufacturing gas by coal carbonisation or catalytic reforming of refinery light-end products such as methane, naphtha or light oils. The advent of natural gas from the North Sea, first landed onshore in 1967, shifted the concerns about supply from an area to a national basis. Gas was now fed to an area rather than being manufactured within the area.

In 1969 the Government recognised that to fully exploit the benefits of North Sea Gas a radical reorganisation of the industry was needed with increased central power. A Bill to realise these changes was introduced in Parliament by the Labour Government in November 1969. However, this Bill failed when Parliament was dissolved for the May 1970 general election. The Conservative Government introduced a new Bill in Parliament in January 1972 to put full responsibility for the gas industry into a new statutory body the British Gas Corporation.

The Gas Act 1972. 
The Gas Act 1972 (1972 chapter 60) received Royal Assent on 9 August 1972. Its long title is: ‘An Act to make fresh provision with respect to the gas industry in Great Britain and related matters, and for purposes connected therewith’.

Provisions 
The Act had 50 Sections in 4 Parts, plus 8 Schedules

Part I defined a new structure for British gas industry. This included the establishment of the British Gas Corporation, its duties and powers, programmes for substantial capital outlay, and the powers of, and reports to, the Secretary of State. It established consumers' bodies such as the National Gas Consumers' Council and the Regional Gas Consumers' Councils, and defined their functions and local representation. The BGC had a specific duty ‘to develop and maintain an efficient, co-ordinated and economical system of gas supply for Great Britain and to satisfy, so far as is economical to do so, all reasonable demands for gas in Great Britain’.

Part II established financial provisions, including the general financial duties of British Gas Corporation, the borrowing powers of the BGC, the issue of British Gas Stock, keeping of accounts and audits.

Part III established provisions for the supply and use of gas. This included methods of charge and tariffs, standards of quality, the Gas Supply Code (Schedule 4), restrictions on supply by persons other than the Corporation, and related provisions. It also defined meter testing and stamping and the power to make safety regulations.

Part IV Defined the position of the BGC with respect of taxation, pension rights, penalties, prosecutions, and offences by corporations, and establishment of inquiries.

Schedule 8 defined statute repeals.

Later Enactments 
The Oil and Gas (Enterprise) Act 1982, amended and repealed certain sections of the 1972 Act.

The Gas Act 1986, which privatised the gas industry, repealed further sections of the 1972 Act.

References 

Natural gas industry in the United Kingdom
United Kingdom Acts of Parliament 1972